The Permanent Representative of Peru to the United Nations is the Permanent Representative of Peru to the United Nations.

Peru is a founding member of the United Nations and has sent permanent representatives since March 1947. Peruvian diplomat Javier Pérez de Cuéllar served as Secretary-General of the United Nations from 1982 to 1991.

List of representatives

See also
Permanent Representative of Peru to the Organization of American States
List of ambassadors of Peru to the European Union
Permanent Delegate of Peru to UNESCO

References

United Nations

Peru